Hexatomini is a tribe of limoniid crane flies in the family Limoniidae. There are about 16 genera and at least 250 described species in Hexatomini.

Genera
 Atarba Osten-sacken, 1869
 Austrolimnophila Alexander, 1920
 Dactylolabis
 Elephantomyia Osten-sacken, 1859
 Epiphragma Osten-sacken, 1859
 Euphylidorea
 Hexatoma Latreille, 1809
 Limnophila Macquart, 1834
 Paradelphomyia Alexander, 1936
 Phyllolabis
 Pilaria Sintenis, 1889
 Polymera
 Prolimnophila
 Pseudolimnophila
 Shannonomyia
 Ulomorpha

References

Further reading

External links

 

Limoniidae